Kevin Broll (born 23 August 1995) is a German professional footballer who plays as a goalkeeper for 3. Liga club Dynamo Dresden.

Career 
Born in Mannheim, Broll started his career at Waldhof Mannheim. In the summer of 2014, Broll signed for FC Homburg on a two-year deal. After a year at Homburg, he signed for 3. Liga club Sonnenhof Großaspach.

On 28 May 2019, he signed for 2. Bundesliga club Dynamo Dresden on a three year deal.

On 4 July 2022, he joined Polish Ekstraklasa side Górnik Zabrze, signing a one-year contract. Broll started the season as a first-choice goalkeeper for the Silesian club, but lost his spot in the starting line-up after eleven matchdays to Daniel Bielica.

On 31 January 2023, he re-joined Dynamo Dresden on a one-year-and-a-half contract.

Personal life
Broll was born in Germany to Polish parents.

References

External links
 

Living people
1995 births
Footballers from Mannheim
German footballers
German people of Polish descent
Association football goalkeepers
SV Waldhof Mannheim players
FC 08 Homburg players
SG Sonnenhof Großaspach players
Dynamo Dresden players
3. Liga players
2. Bundesliga players
Ekstraklasa players
Górnik Zabrze players
German expatriate footballers
German expatriate sportspeople in Poland
Expatriate footballers in Poland